John Duncan Macrae (20 August 1905 – 23 March 1967) was one of the leading Scottish actors of his generation. He worked mainly as a stage actor and also made five television appearances and seventeen films.

Life and career
He was born at 118 Kirkland Street, Maryhill, Glasgow, the fourth of the six children of James Macrae, a sergeant in the Glasgow police force, and his wife, Catherine Graham. He attended Allan Glen's School and matriculated in the engineering faculty at Glasgow University in 1923–1924, but did not graduate. He trained as a schoolteacher at Jordanhill College, where he met Ann H Mcallister, the voice coach, who was a profound influence on his life. He taught in Glasgow until he became a professional actor in 1943, after a successful amateur drama career.

He first made his name as a comic actor of distinction with Curtain Theatre, an amateur group, in 1937, in the title role of Robert McLellan's Jamie the Saxt, a performance which became his "signature" role in the early years. In 1938, he directed Curtain's production of Henrik Ibsen's Hedda Gabler at the Lyric Theatre in Glasgow. He was then a member, along with Stanley Baxter, of the early Citizens' Theatre company in Glasgow, founded during the war in 1943. In 1948, he played Oliphant, the Laird of Stumpie, in the first performance of Robert Kemp's Let Wives Tak Tent, a translation into Scots of Moliere's L'école des femmes, at the Gateway Theatre in Edinburgh.

He had a role in the 1949 Ealing comedy Whisky Galore!, based on the book by Sir Compton Mackenzie, and, in the first TV series adapted from stories about Para Handy – Master Mariner, Neil Munro's masterpiece of west coast "high jinks", Macrae played the eponymous Captain. He lived in Glasgow and also had a home in Millport on the island of Cumbrae. In 1953 he starred alongside Jean Anderson in the role of James MacKenzie, an embittered settler in the drama The Kidnappers for which he received a Scottish Arts Council award. One of the film's most memorable moments comes with the horror on Duncan Macrae's face at what his grandchild must have thought of him when the little boy implores "Don't eat the babbie".

Macrae played the Nabob in the Edinburgh Gateway Company's Edinburgh International Festival production of McLellan's historical comedy The Flouers o Edinburgh in August 1957. He then played the title role in James Bridie's Dr. Angelus at The Gateway before returning to the Citizens' to play Malvolio in Shakespeare's Twelfth Night.

During the 1960s he appeared in episodes of the cult TV series The Avengers and The Prisoner, as well as Inspector Mathis in the James Bond spoof Casino Royale.

Macrae became a mainstay of television Hogmanay celebrations in the 1950s and 1960s with a rendition of his song (in Glaswegian Scots), "The Wee Cock Sparra".

Macrae died in March 1967, in Glasgow, before the release of several screen appearances: in the films Casino Royale, and 30 Is a Dangerous Age, Cynthia, and in the television series The Wednesday Play and The Prisoner.

Selected filmography
 The Brothers (1947): John MacRae
 Whisky Galore! (1949): Angus MacCormac
 The Woman in Question (1950): Supt. Lodge
 You're Only Young Twice (1952): Prof. Hayman
 The Kidnappers (1953): Jim MacKenzie, Granddaddy
 Geordie (1955): Schoolmaster
 Rockets Galore! (1957): Duncan Ban
 The Bridal Path (1959): H.Q. Police Sgt.
 Our Man in Havana (1959): MacDougal
 Kidnapped (1960): The Highlander
 Tunes of Glory (1960): Pipe Major Maclean
 Greyfriars Bobby (1961): Sgt. Davie Maclean
 The Best of Enemies (1961): Sgt. Trevethan
 Girl in the Headlines (1963): Barney
 A Jolly Bad Fellow (1964): Dr. Brass
 Casino Royale (1967): Inspector Mathis
 30 Is a Dangerous Age, Cynthia (1968): Jock McCue (final film role)

Television
 Para Handy - Master Mariner (1959): Para Handy 
 Kidnapped (1963): Ebeneezer Balfour 
 The Avengers (1964), episode "Esprit de Corps": Brigadier General Sir Ian Stuart-Bollinger 
 Dr Finlay's Casebook (1964): Cogger
 The Prisoner (1967), episode "Dance of the Dead": Doctor/Napoleon Bonaparte

References

External links

Duncan MacRae on Vimeo (A Wee Coak Sparrah)

1905 births
1967 deaths
Male actors from Glasgow
Scottish male film actors
Scottish male television actors
People educated at Allan Glen's School
Alumni of the University of Glasgow
Scottish male stage actors
Scottish male comedians
20th-century Scottish male actors
People from Maryhill
20th-century British comedians